The 1976–77 season of the European Cup Winners' Cup was won by Hamburger SV in the final against defending champions Anderlecht.

Qualifying match

|}

First round

|}

First leg

Second leg

Boavista won 5–2 on aggregate.

Napoli won 3–0 on aggregate.

Southampton won 5–2 on aggregate.

Second round

|}

First leg

Second leg

Napoli won 3–1 on aggregate.

Quarter-finals

|}

First leg

Second leg

Napoli won 2–0 on aggregate.

Semi-finals

|}

First leg

Second leg

Anderlecht won 2–1 on aggregate.

Final

See also
1976–77 European Cup
1976–77 UEFA Cup

External links
 1976-77 competition at UEFA website
 Cup Winners' Cup results at Rec.Sport.Soccer Statistics Foundation
 Cup Winners Cup Seasons 1976-77–results, protocols
 website Football Archive 1976–77 Cup Winners Cup

3
UEFA Cup Winners' Cup seasons